Maitee Hatsady (born as Maitee Sihalart on 10 June 1998 and simply known by his first name) is a Laotian footballer who played as an attacking midfielder. He was banned for life from all football-related activities as a result of match-fixing, along with 21 other players of his club Lao Toyota and the national team.

Club career
Maitee played for Lao Toyota from 2015 to 2017. In a match against Ayeyawady United at the 2015 AFC Cup, he scored an impressive 30-yard free kick, although Lao Toyota eventually lost 4-3.

International career
Maitee made his senior international debut in 2016 against Nepal, although he had been called up at the age of 16 for the 2014 AFF Championship without making an appearance.

References

1998 births
Living people
Laotian footballers
Laos international footballers
Association football midfielders
Lao Toyota F.C. players
Sportspeople involved in betting scandals
Sportspeople banned for life
People from Vientiane